Serena Williams defeated Steffi Graf in the final, 6–3, 3–6, 7–5 to win the women's singles tennis title at the 1999 Indian Wells Open. It was the second and last time that the two would contest a professional match.

Martina Hingis was the defending champion, but lost in the quarterfinals to Chanda Rubin.

Seeds
The top eight seeds received a bye to the second round.

Draw

Finals

Top half

Section 1

Section 2

Bottom half

Section 3

Section 4

Qualifying

Seeds

Qualifiers

Qualifying draw

First qualifier

Second qualifier

Third qualifier

Fourth qualifier

Fifth qualifier

Sixth qualifier

Seventh qualifier

Eighth qualifier

External links
 ITF tournament draws

Evert Cup
1999 Newsweek Champions Cup and the Evert Cup